Federico Martin Villar (born November 24, 1985 in Buenos Aires, Argentina) is an Argentine football defender.

Villar started his career in the lower divisions of Argentine football with Club Atlético Mitre. In January 2008, Villar signed with PFC Spartak Varna in Bulgaria.

References

External links
 Federico Villar at BDFA.com.ar 
 2007-08 Statistics  at PFL.bg

1985 births
Living people
Footballers from Buenos Aires
Argentine footballers
First Professional Football League (Bulgaria) players
PFC Spartak Varna players
Argentino de Rosario footballers
Mons Calpe S.C. players
St Joseph's F.C. players
Association football defenders
Argentine expatriate footballers
Expatriate footballers in Bulgaria
Expatriate footballers in Gibraltar
Argentine expatriate sportspeople in Gibraltar
Argentine expatriate sportspeople in Bulgaria
Boca Río Gallegos footballers
Central Córdoba de Rosario footballers
San Martín de Burzaco footballers
Gibraltar Premier Division players